Chisoneta is a genus of North American Leptonetids that was first described by J. Ledford in 2011.

Species
 it contains four species:
Chisoneta chisosea (Gertsch, 1974) – USA
Chisoneta isolata (Gertsch, 1971) (type) – Mexico
Chisoneta modica (Gertsch, 1974) – Mexico
Chisoneta pecki (Gertsch, 1971) – Mexico

See also
 List of Leptonetidae species

References

Araneomorphae genera
Leptonetidae
Spiders of Mexico
Spiders of the United States